HCH may refer to:

 Hampton Court House, an independent school in Surrey, UK
 Hexachlorocyclohexane, a group of chemical compounds
 Holmes Chapel railway station (National Rail station code), in Cheshire, England
 Huế Central Hospital, in Vietnam
 Huichol language, an indigenous language of Mexico
 Hypochondroplasia, a developmental disorder